Enver Gennadievich Lisin (born April 22, 1986) is a Russian professional ice hockey forward who is currently an unrestricted free agent. He most recently played for Traktor Chelyabinsk in the Kontinental Hockey League (KHL).  He was Russian champion in 2006 and won European champion's cup in 2007.  Lisin was drafted 50th overall in the 2004 NHL Entry Draft by the Phoenix Coyotes.

Playing career
As a boy, Lisin played in the 2000 Quebec International Pee-Wee Hockey Tournament with the HC CSKA Moscow youth team.

Known for being a very fast skater, Lisin played two seasons in the top tier Russian Superleague before opting to pursue his North American career with the Coyotes. His nickname in the Phoenix Coyotes locker room was Webster.

Lisin was traded to the New York Rangers from the Coyotes in exchange for Lauri Korpikoski on July 13, 2009.  He became an unrestricted free agent on July 1, 2010 when the Rangers declined to make him a qualifying offer. With limited NHL interest he decided to continue his career in his native Russia joining Metallurg Magnitogorsk of the KHL on October 4, 2010.

After stints with Admiral Vladivostok and CSKA Moscow, Lisin signed a two-year contract as a free agent with Salavat Yulaev Ufa on May 1, 2015.

Lisin played three seasons with Ufa, before beginning the 2018–19 season with HC Sibir Novosibirsk. He registered 4 assists in 10 games before he left to sign for the remainder of the season with Spartak Moscow on October 10, 2018.

On May 1, 2019, as a free agent from Spartak, Lisin signed a one-year KHL contract with Traktor Chelyabinsk.

Career statistics

Regular season and playoffs

International

References

External links

1986 births
Living people
Admiral Vladivostok players
Ak Bars Kazan players
Arizona Coyotes draft picks
HC CSKA Moscow players
Metallurg Magnitogorsk players
New York Rangers players
People from Voskresensk
Phoenix Coyotes players
Russian ice hockey right wingers
Russian people of Abkhazian descent
Salavat Yulaev Ufa players
San Antonio Rampage players
HC Sibir Novosibirsk players
HC Spartak Moscow players
Tatar people of Russia
Tatar sportspeople
Traktor Chelyabinsk players
Sportspeople from Moscow Oblast